Sri Venkateshwara College of Engineering (SVCE) is a private engineering college located near Chikkajala, Vidyanagar about 22 km from Bangalore on the National Highway No.7. The college is approved by AICTE, New Delhi and affiliated to Visvesvaraya Technological University, Belgaum. The Bangalore International Airport at Devanahalli is 12 km away from the campus. Locate us on Google Map

Courses Offered 
The college offers a wide range of courses as listed below.

Undergraduate Programmes 
Bachelor of Engineering
Electronics and Communication Engineering
Computer Science and Engineering
Computer Science and Engineering (Artificial Intelligence)
Information Science and Engineering
Mechanical Engineering
Civil Engineering
Mechatronics

Postgraduate Programmes 
Master of Technology
 Structural Engineering
Master of Business Administration

Research Programmes 
Doctor of Philosophy
 Electronics and Communication Engineering
 Computer Science and Engineering
 Mechanical Engineering
 Civil Engineering
 Physics
 Master of Business Administration

External links 
 SVCE homepage
 SVCE - Official App
 Facebook page

Engineering colleges in Bangalore
All India Council for Technical Education
Affiliates of Visvesvaraya Technological University
Educational institutions established in 2001
2001 establishments in Karnataka